Jan Eivind Myhre (born 26 April 1947) is a Norwegian historian.

He was a professor II at the University of Tromsø from 1991 to 2001, became a professor at the Norwegian University of Science and Technology in 1994 and then at the University of Oslo in 1996.

He is a member of the Norwegian Academy of Science and Letters.

Selected bibliography
Sagene - en arbeiderforstad befolkes 1801-1875, 1978
Mennesker i Kristiania. Sosialhistorisk søkelys på 1800-tallet, 1979 (co-ed.) 
Bærum 1840-1980, 1982
Hovedstaden Christiania: 1814-1900, 1990 (volume 3 of Oslo bys historie)
Barndom i storbyen. Oppvekst i Oslo i velferdsstatens epoke, 1994
Oslo - spenningenes by. Oslohistorie, 1995, with Knut Kjeldstadli
Making a Historical Culture. Historiography in Norway, 1995 (co-ed.)
Nord-Norges modernisering, 1995 (ed.) Historikerne som historie, 1996 (co-ed.) 
Valg og vitenskap, 1997 (co-ed.) 
Nordic Historiography in the 20th Century, 2000 (co-ed.). 
I nasjonalstatens tid 1814-1940, 2003 (volume 2 of Norsk innvandringshistorie) 
The Scandinavian Middle Classes 1840-1940, 2004 (co-ed.).

References

University of Oslo
List of publications in FRIDA

1947 births
Living people
20th-century Norwegian historians
Academic staff of the University of Tromsø
Academic staff of the Norwegian University of Science and Technology
Academic staff of the University of Oslo
Members of the Norwegian Academy of Science and Letters
21st-century Norwegian historians